CLIX (Canonical LMNL in XML), a method of using valid XML for overlapping markup.

References

XML markup languages